The Weidner, also known as the Weidner Center for the Performing Arts, WCPA, or Weidner Center is a performing arts center in Green Bay, Wisconsin, on the University of Wisconsin–Green Bay campus. Named after the university's first chancellor, Edward Weidner, the venue opened January 15, 1993.

History 
The Weidner's original gift came from surgeon David A. Cofrin (son of Austin E. Cofrin and namesake of UW-Green Bay's library) with the stipulation that the center be located on the UW-Green Bay campus and that it serve the community. The university used state funds for the project as the original plan for UW-Green Bay's campus included a performing arts center. Namesake chancellor Weidner began a fundraising campaign in the late 1980s that raised the remainder of the $18.4 million required for the building. The university calls The Weidner a "'comm-university' center, supported by both the university and the communities of northeastern Wisconsin".

1998 expansion 
For The Weidner's fifth anniversary, donations from the Cofrin family financed an expansion that included a new black-box theatre named Studio Two, later renamed the Jean Weidner Theatre in honor of Ed Weidner's wife. The renovation also expanded the ticket office, added more lobby restrooms, expanded backstage storage and dressing room space, constructed a semi-private dining area and food service elevator, and relocated The Weidner's administrative offices.

Facilities

Cofrin Family Hall 
Cofrin Family Hall is The Weidner's main performance facility, seating 2,021 over three levels of seating. The capacity of Cofrin Family Hall depends on the type of performance, as The Weidner's two-section motorized thrust stage can be lowered and fitted with extra seats, typically for dramatic performances. Symphonic and other music-only performances routinely use the entire thrust. Cofrin Family Hall also contains a large pipe organ, the Wood Family Organ, built for The Weidner's acoustics. Nearly all of The Weidner's touring acts perform in Cofrin Family Hall, with eclectic programming that includes concerts, comedians, Broadway shows, children's programming, and more. UW-Green Bay holds its winter graduations in Cofrin Family Hall.

The UWGB Music department's Symphonic Band, Wind Ensemble, University Singers, and Concert Choir all perform two concerts per semester in Cofrin Family Hall, and the department's annual JazzFest takes place in Cofrin Family Hall in the spring.

The UWGB Theatre department performs in Cofrin Family Hall occasionally, putting on Cabaret in 2011. It performed another musical there in fall 2015 and participated in The Weidner's Stage Door educational theatre series in spring 2016 and 2017.

Fort Howard Hall 
Fort Howard Hall, named for the Fort Howard Paper Company founded by donor Austin E. Cofrin, is a recital hall. It seats 200 in retractable theatre-style seating, and can seat 136 in a  banquet-style setting. The room is used for receptions and pre-show dinners. The UWGB Music department is the most frequent academic user of the space, and holds its Student Honors Recital and several guest artist concerts and lectures there annually.

Studio One 
Built in the style of a dance studio with mirrors and marley dance floor, Studio One is rarely used for its intended purpose, instead serving as a multipurpose space for The Weidner, and a reception area/backstage storage for the UWGB Theatre department when it is performing in the Jean Weidner Theatre.

Jean Weidner Theatre 
Built in the 1998 renovation and originally called Studio Two, the space was renamed the Jean Weidner Theatre after Edward Weidner's wife. Jean Weidner Theatre is a black-box style theatre that seats 90 in either a standard theatre style or a theatre in the round arrangement. Although it is part of The Weidner, the UWGB Theatre department oversees the space and is its primary user. The UWGB Music department holds most of its student recitals in the space, along with its Opera/Musical Theatre workshop.

Weidner Philharmonic 
The Weidner Philharmonic is The Weidner's symphony since 2019. They have partnered with Northeastern Wisconsin Dance Organization to provide live orchestration for The Nutcracker ballet. They also have reoccurring performances called Symphonic Night at the Movies where they play the score of a movie while the movie plays on a screen behind them.

*Virtual Performance

The Weidner Downtown at the Tarlton Theatre 

In February 2022 The Weidner, in partnership with The Tarlton Theatre, announced The Weidner Downtown at the Tarlton Theatre series, also shortened to The Weidner Downtown. The series aims to bring an eclectic mix of arts and culture including chamber theatre, film, live lit, music, and more to downtown Green Bay at The Tarlton Theatre.

The partnership was announced to continue into 2023.

Notable performers 

Aaron Neville
Alton Brown
Andy Grammer
Ann Margaret
Anne Murray
Anthony Bourdain
BB King
Bernadette Peters
Beverly Sills
Bill Cosby
Bob Newhart
Bonnie Raitt
Bryan Adams
Cathy Rigby
Colin Mochrie
Dionne Warwick
Frankie Valli
Gabriel Iglesias
George Carlin
Glen Campbell
Goo Goo Dolls
Hal Holbrook
Iliza Shlesinger
Itzhak Perlman
James Taylor
Jerry Seinfeld
Jimmy Fallon
Joe Bonamassa
John Cleese
John Denver
John Mellencamp
Johnny Cash
Judy Collins
Kathy Griffin
Kenny G
Kenny Rogers
Lewis Black
Lily Tomlin
Lisa Lampanelli
Loretta Swit
Mandy Patinkin
Marie Osmond
Martin Short
Paula Poundstone
Peabo Bryson
Penn & Teller 
Ralph Macchio
Randy Travis
Rick Springfield
Rita Rudner
Robert Goulet
Sebastian Maniscalco
Shari Lewis
Tim Conway
Tony Bennett
Tony Curtis
Vince Gill
Willie Nelson

Notable speakers 

Anna Quindlen 
Bernie Sanders
David Axelrod
Doris Kearns Goodwin
Gregory Peck
Jane Pauley
Jeannette Walls
Joan Rivers
Julie Andrews
Karl Rove
Kobie Boykins
Madeleine Albright
Marianne Pearl
Marlee Matlin
Maya Angelou
Michael Moore
Mitch Albom
Michael Beschloss
Star Jones

Notable performances and shows 

42nd Street
Aida
American Indian Dance Theatre
Annie
The Best Little Whorehouse in Texas
Blue Man Group
Blue's Clues Live!
Cabaret
Camelot
Celtic Women the Emerald Tour
Cirque Mechanics Pedal Punk
A Charlie Brown Christmas Live on Stage
Chicago
A Chorus Line
Dial M for Murder
Disenchanted!
Dr. Seuss' How the Grinch Stole Christmas! The Musical
Fiddler on the Roof
Finding Neverland
Fosse
Grease
Mark Twain Tonight
How to Succeed in Business Without Really Trying
“I Love Lucy” Live on Stage
It's a Wonderful Life a Live Radio Play
Jekyll & Hyde
Jersey Boys
Joseph and the Amazing Technicolor Dreamcoat
Legally Blonde the Musical
Man of la Mancha
Les Misérables
Monty Python's Spamalot
Moulin Rouge the Ballet
The Music Man
Once
Pippin
The Phantom of the Opera
Rain: A Tribute to the Beatles
Rent
Riders in the Sky
Riverdance
Rock of Ages
Rodgers and Hammerstein's Cinderella
Saturday Night Fever
Say Goodnight Gracie
The Scarlet Pimpernel
Shrek the Musical
The Simon & Garfunkel Story
Sister Act
Some Like it Hot
The Sound of Music
Stomp!
The Ten Tenors
Titanic a New Musical
Thoroughly Modern Millie
Whose Live Anyway?
West Side Story

Artwork

Josephine B. Lenfestey Chandelier 

The Weidner installed the Josephine B. Lenfestey Chandelier created by Dale Chihuly in the summer of 2004. The chandelier has more than 450 individual pieces of blown glass and is 12 by 8 feet. The installation took 3 days in June and had a public unveiling on September 12, 2004.

See also
List of concert halls

References

External links
Weidner Center for the Performing Arts

Theatres in Wisconsin
Concert halls in the United States
Performing arts centers in Wisconsin
Buildings and structures in Green Bay, Wisconsin
Culture of Green Bay, Wisconsin
University of Wisconsin–Green Bay
Tourist attractions in Brown County, Wisconsin
1993 establishments in Wisconsin